Ibrahim Megag Samatar (Ibrahim Maygaag Samatar, 1939 – 31 January 2011) was a Somali politician and economist.

He is said to have been born in Hargeisa, British Somaliland, but he was born in Qullad, Ethiopia, a town between Hargeisa and Aware, Ethiopia.

His passport says he was born on 20 February 1942, but in fact, he was born between 1939 and 1941. The BBC also says he was born in 1939.

He studied at Yale University and the University of California, Riverside in the United States, and returned to Somalia to become a bureaucrat in the Ministry of Finance. From 1970 to 1971 he was Minister of Finance in the cabinet of Siad Barre, who came to power after the coup d'état. After serving as Minister of Industry, he defected to the United States in 1981 when he was Ambassador to West Germany.

After his exile, he served as the North American representative of the Somali National Movement. He chaired the Somaliland House of Representatives at the 1991 conference in Burao, and was instrumental in Somaliland's independence. He was elected to the House of Representatives at the National Reconciliation Grand Council in Borama in 1993, but soon resigned and retired from politics.

He came to Japan in 1997 and worked as a researcher at Josai International University.

He died on 31 January 2011 at his home in Tōgane, Chiba Prefecture, at 68.

Notes

1943 births
2011 deaths
Speakers of the House of Representatives (Somaliland)
Somaliland politicians
Finance ministers of Somalia
Somalian politicians
Somalian scholars
Ambassadors of Somalia
People from Hargeisa